André da Silva Gomes (1752–1844) was a Portuguese-born Brazilian composer from Lisbon. About 130 of his compositions are known, including mass settings, antiphons, psalm settings and other works for liturgical use. His Missa a Cinco Vozes is described as being in a style midway between Baroque and Classicism. He also published a treatise on counterpoint.

See also
List of Portuguese composers

References

Portuguese composers
Portuguese male composers
1752 births
1844 deaths
People from Lisbon
Brazilian composers
Portuguese expatriates in Brazil